Harry Fiedler (born 30 July 1941) is a German former fencer. He competed for East Germany at the 1968 and 1972 Summer Olympics.

References

1941 births
Living people
German male fencers
Olympic fencers of East Germany
Fencers at the 1968 Summer Olympics
Fencers at the 1972 Summer Olympics
Sportspeople from Wrocław